This is a list of the Australian moth species of the family Palaephatidae. It also acts as an index to the species articles and forms part of the full List of moths of Australia.

Azaleodes brachyceros Nielsen, 1987
Azaleodes fuscipes Nielsen, 1987
Azaleodes megaceros Nielsen, 1987
Azaleodes micronipha Turner, 1923
Ptyssoptera acrozyga (Meyrick, 1893)
Ptyssoptera lativittella (Walker, 1864)
Ptyssoptera melitocoma (Meyrick, 1893)
Ptyssoptera phaeochrysa (Turner, 1926)
Ptyssoptera teleochra (Meyrick, 1893)
Ptyssoptera tetropa (Meyrick, 1893)
Ptyssoptera tryphera (Meyrick, 1893)

External links 
Palaephatidae at Australian Faunal Directory

Australia
Palaephatidae